The Film Development Council of the Philippines (FDCP) is the national film agency under the Office of the President of the Philippines responsible for film policies and programs to ensure the economic, cultural and educational development of the Philippine film industry. It aims to encourage the production of quality films and to conduct film-related events that enhance the skills of the Filipino talents. The agency also leads the film industry’s participation in domestic and foreign film markets, and local and international film festivals, and is tasked to preserve and protect films as part of the country’s national cultural heritage.

History

Film Development Council of the Philippines (2002-present)
The FDCP was created by Republic Act 9167, “An Act Creating the Film Development Council of the Philippines, Defining its Powers and Functions, Appropriating Funds Therefore, and for Other Purposes”, which was approved by the 12th Congress on June 7, 2002. The FDCP is under the Office of the President of the Philippines. The creation of the FDCP is pursuant to the constitutional guarantee on freedom of expression by which the State, as a policy, recognizes the need to promote and support the development and growth of the local film industry as a medium for the upliftment of aesthetic, cultural and social values for the better understanding and appreciation of the Filipino identity. Republic Act 9167 abolished the Film Development Foundation of the Philippines, Inc. [FDFPI] and the Film Ratings Board [FRB] and transferred all their books, assets, rights, privileges, records, obligations and liabilities to the FDCP.

Film Development Foundation of the Philippines, Inc (1985-2002)
The FDFPI was established by Executive Order No. 1051 signed on August 8, 1985, by President Ferdinand E. Marcos, which became functional on October 2, 1985, after it was registered with the Securities and Exchange Commission. The same Executive Order ended the Experimental Cinema of the Philippines [ECP]. The Film Ratings Board was established in 1982 by virtue of Executive Order No. 811 signed by President Ferdinand E. Marcos. From 1982 to 1984, it functioned as one of the five modules under the ECP together with the Film Fund, Alternative Cinema, Film Archives, and Manila International Film Festival [MIFF]. It ceased to operate in 1985 when the ECP was abolished. In 1994, a directive from President Fidel V. Ramos revived the FRB, which was placed under the newly-activated FDFPI. The FRB was re-established by President Ramos to encourage the local film industry to make better and higher quality films through amusement tax rebates.

Experimental Cinema of the Philippines (1982-1985)

Experimental Cinema of the Philippines (ECP) was established by Executive Order No. 770 signed on January 29, 1982, by President Ferdinand E. Marcos, ECP created to promote the growth and development of the local film industry. ECP created after the first Manila International Film Festival, the ECP was primarily known as a production company. However, it was created among other things; to hold the Manila International Film Festival, to manage the Manila Film Center, administer a film rating and classification system and to establish and operate the National Film Archive. It was also mandated to provide financial assistance to select motion pictures through a film fund.

Officials
 Tirso S. Cruz III, Chairperson and CEO
 Daniel David Morales - Executive Director III
 Emelita A. Alquiza - Chief Administrative Officer, Admin & Finance
 Raymond Joseph G. Chan - Head/PDO V, FilmPhilippines Incentives
 Don Gervin T. Arawan - Head/PDO V, Philippine Film Archive
 Rica Leticia I. Arevalo - Head/PDO V, Development Support Division
 Jo Andrew A. Torlao - Head/PDO IV, Film Distribution Division
 Daniella Julieta Caro - Head/PDO III, Film Exhibition Division
 Rachelle P. Villaluna - Head/PDO III, Legal & Policy Reserch Unit
 Andrew S. Dalde - Head/Creatives Lead Officer, Communications Unit

Programs

Philippine Film Export Services Office
The Philippine Film Export Service Office (PFESO) was created with decidedly global perspective and objective: to promote the country as a viable and effective location site and post-production service provider in the region. PFESO was created via Executive Order 674 s. 2007, and its primary mandate is to facilitate the promotion of the Philippines as a viable filming location for foreign film and television content production, and for the following objectives:
 To streamline and expedite processing of requirements for foreign filmmakers seeking to film in the Philippines.
 To strengthen linkages and collaboration among foreign film producers and film bodies with Philippines’ homegrown pool of film workers and film production teams.
 To carry out the government's policy of maximizing the country's potential as a location site for international film and television content production.

Film Distribution and Exhibition
Beginning 2021, The FDCP had started to acquire Philippine release rights to a handful of independent, foreign-language and art-house films such as Portrait of a Lady on Fire and The Worst Person in the World. Under the Film Cultural Exchange Program (FCEP), the films are rated through the FDCP rating system pursuant to the agreed-upon guidelines by the FDCP and the MTRCB.

Pista ng Pelikulang Pilipino

The Pista ng Pelikulang Pilipino is a one-week exclusive screening of Filipino films in all theaters nationwide. It was launched in August 2017 by the Film Development Council of the Philippines in partnership with theaters nationwide.

CineLokal
CineLokal is an alternative and accessible venue for exhibiting Filipino and world cinema. Started last April 19, 2017, eight theaters was dedicated by SM Cinemas in the Philippines to screening two films selected by the FDCP. The selection ranges from award-winning Filipino movies, independently produced movies, regional films, classic films from great Filipino directors, and limited release foreign films.

References

External links
Film Development Council of the Philippines official website

Film organizations in the Philippines
Government agencies under the Office of the President of the Philippines
Government agencies established in 2002